The 2007 floods of Africa was reported by the UN to be one of the worst floodings in recorded history. The flooding started with rains on September 14, 2007 local time. Over 14 countries had been affected in the continent of Africa, 250 people were reported to have been killed by the flooding and 1.5 million were affected. The UN had issued warnings of water borne diseases and locust infestations.

Info from African sources

Ghana
400,000 were homeless with at least 20 people dead and crops and livestock had been washed away. 

George Azi Amoo - Ghana's national disaster management co-ordinator

Sudan
64 people were reported killed.

Ethiopia
17 people were reported dead. In the Afar Region, the Awash River flooded caused a dam to collapse. Around 4,500 people were stranded, surrounded by water.

Uganda
150,000 people were displaced and 21 reported dead. 170 schools were under water.

Rwanda
18 people were reported dead and 500 residences were washed away by floods.

Mali
5 bridges had collapsed and 250 residences were washed away.

Burkina Faso
33 people were reported dead.

Kenya
12 people were reported dead.

Togo
20 people were reported dead.

See also 
2009 West Africa floods
Global storm activity of 2007
Water scarcity in Africa

References

External links
Africa Floods reported by BBC News
Independent article on the floods
 Sunday Times article
 BBC News article
 Kansas City Star
 ABC.net.au article
 Africa Floods Appeal
 West Africa Floods (as of October 2007) - UN/ROWA

African floods
Floods
Floods in Africa
2007 disasters in Africa